Abderraouf Derradji (born 10 December 1989), known professionally as Soolking, is an Algerian singer and rapper. He started his career under the pseudonym MC Sool until 2013 before adopting his new stage name. He incorporates reggae, soul, hip hop and Algerian raï in his music.

Life and career
Derradji was born in Algeria in a northern suburb of the capital Algiers, also known as Staouali. His father was a percussionist and he started very young in a rock band incorporating music and dance. He arrived in France in 2008, but returned to Algeria to be included in the Algerian rap formation Africa Jungle. The band released two albums.

He started his solo career in 2016 and is signed to the label Affranchis Music launched by Sofiane. He had an initial success with "Milano" and "Guérilla" before a phenomenal success with "Dalida",  an homage to the singer Dalida, sampling her hit "Paroles, paroles". On 2 November 2018, Soolking released his debut solo album Fruit du démon that was certified Gold in France. The singles "Guérilla" and "Dalida" were certified Platinum. He released his second studio album Vintage in 2020. On 26 May 2022, he released Sans visa, his third album.

2019 accident
On August 22, 2019, Soolking held a large concert at Stade 20 Août 1955, accompanied by L'Algérino, Fianso, Alonzo and Dhurata Dora. During entering the stadium five people died due to the stampede. Soolking said after the concert that if he knew what happened he would have cancelled the concert, and one of the reasons for the accident was that tickets were sold more than the stadium capacity.

Discography

Albums

Singles

As lead artist

As featured artist

Other charting songs

Various releases
2016: "Vida Loca"
2016: "Barbe noire"
2017: "Fuego" (feat. Ghost ST)
2017: "Dounia"
2017: "Yeah!"
2017: "Blanco Griselda"
2017: "T.R.W" (feat. Alonzo)
2017: "Bilal" (feat. 7Liwa)
2017: "Mi Amigo"

References

External links
Soolking Official - YouTube

Algerian rappers
1989 births
Living people
21st-century Algerian  male  singers
21st-century rappers
Male rappers
People from Algiers Province